The 33rd GLAAD Media Awards is a 2022 annual presentation of the GLAAD Media Awards, presented by GLAAD honoring the 2021 media season. It was held on April 2, 2022 in Los Angeles and was later held on May 6, 2022 in New York City. The awards honor films, television shows, video games, musicians and works of journalism that fairly, accurately and inclusively represent the LGBT community and issues relevant to the community. GLAAD announced the 198 nominees split across 28 categories on January 19, 2022 on TikTok. For the first time since 2019, the winners were announced in an in-person ceremony. Michaela Jaé Rodriguez, Kacey Musgraves, Judith Light and Wilson Cruz received special recognition awards for their advocacy.

Nominees
The nominees were announced on GLAAD's TikTok page on January 19, 2022.

Once announced, winners once will be listed first, highlighted in boldface, and indicated with a double dagger.

Film

Television

Journalism

Other

Spanish Language

Special Recognition

Stephen F. Kolzak Award: Michaela Jaé Rodriguez
Vanguard Award: Kacey Musgraves
Excellence in Media Award: Judith Light
GLAAD Vito Russo Award: Wilson Cruz

References

GLAAD Media Awards ceremonies
GLAAD
2022 in LGBT history